Robbert is a Dutch form of the masculine given name Robert. People with the name include:

 Robbert A.J. Agerbeek (born 1937), Indo Dutch boogie-woogie and jazz pianist
 Robbert Andringa (born 1990), Dutch volleyball player
 Robbert Baruch (born 1967), Dutch politician
 Robbert-Kees Boer (born 1981), Dutch short track speed skater
 Robbert van de Corput (born 1988), Dutch house DJ known as "Hardwell"
 Robbert Dijkgraaf (born 1960), Dutch mathematical physicist
 Robbert Duval (1639–1732), Dutch painter
  (1771–1856), Dutch army general and government minister
 Robbert Valentijn Gonggrijp (born 1968), Dutch hacker
 Robbert Hartog (1919–2008), Dutch-born Canadian businessman
 Robbert van 't Hoff (1887–1979), Dutch architect and furniture designer
 Robbert Kemperman (born 1990), Dutch field hockey player
 Robbert Klomp (born 1955), Dutch-born Australian rules footballer
 Robbert te Loeke (born 1988), Dutch footballer
 Robbert van Mesdag (born 1930), Dutch rower
 Robbert Olijfveld (born 1994), Dutch footballer
 Robbert Schilder (born 1986), Dutch footballer
 Robbert Vos (born 1986), Dutch euphonium player and conductor
 Robbert Vieira (born 1976),  Canadian short story author

See also

References 

Dutch masculine given names